The Canon EF-S 15–85mm f/3.5–5.6 IS USM is a standard zoom lens for Canon digital single-lens reflex cameras with an EF-S lens mount. The field of view has a 35 mm equivalent focal length of 24–136mm. The EF-S mount was specifically designed for APS-C cameras.

It is the higher end kit lens for the Canon EOS 7D.

References

External links 

Canon EF-S 15–85mm – Canon UK
Canon EF-S 15–85mm – Canon USA
Press Release – Digital Photography Review

Reviews 
photozone.de
the-digital-picture.com
cameralabs.com

15-85mm
Camera lenses introduced in 2009